The Independent Spirit Award for Best First Feature is one of the annual Independent Spirit Awards. It is usually given to the director (or directors) and producer (or producers). The "first feature" designation is applied to the director not the producer(s). Therefore, producers have been nominated multiple times. It was first presented in 1986 with Spike Lee's She's Gotta Have It being the first recipient of the award.

In 2000, this category was split into two separate categories: one for films with budgets over $500,000 and a new category, the Independent Spirit John Cassavetes Award, which was restricted to films with budgets under $500,000. In 2001, films could be eligible regardless of their budget as long as it was feature film directorial debut.

Winners and nominees

1980s

1990s

2000s

2010s

2020s

References

External links
Every BEST FIRST FEATURE winner ever on Film Independent's official YouTube channel

F
Awards for best film
Directorial debut film awards
Awards established in 1987